Field Mouse are an American dream pop band from Philadelphia, Pennsylvania and Brooklyn, New York.

History
Field Mouse began in 2010 with the release of their first full-length album titled You Are Here. In 2012, Field Mouse released a two-song EP titled You Guys Are Gonna Wake Up My Mom. On October 16, 2012, Field Mouse released a 7" titled How Do You Know via Lefse Records.

In early 2013, Field Mouse self-released an EP titled Tour EP. In April 2014, Field Mouse announced they had signed to Topshelf Records, with plans to release a full-length in the future. Three months later, Field Mouse released their second full-length album titled Hold Still Life on Topshelf Records. In August 2016 they released their second album Episodic.

Band members
Rachel Browne (vocals, guitar)
Andrew Futral (guitar)
Saysha Heinzman (bass)
Tim McCoy (drums)
Zoë Browne (synthesizer, guitar)

Discography
Studio albums
You Are Here (2010, self-released)
Hold Still Life (2014, Topshelf)
Episodic (2016, Topshelf)
Meaning (2019, Topshelf)
EPs
You Guys Are Gonna Wake Up My Mom   (2012, Small Plates)
How Do You Know (2012, Lefse)
Tour EP (2013, self-released)
Compilations
Topshelf Records 2014 Tour - A Great Big Pile of Leaves,  Diamond Youth, Prawn, Field Mouse

References

Indie pop groups from Pennsylvania
Topshelf Records artists